"I Sure Can Smell the Rain" is a song written by Walt Aldridge and John Jarrard, and recorded by American country music band  Blackhawk. It was released in August 1994 as the third single from their self-titled debut album. It peaked at number 9 on both the United States Billboard Hot Country Singles & Tracks and the Canadian RPM Country Tracks charts.

Content
The song is an introspective ballad about a relationship falling apart.

Music video
The music video was directed by Marius Penczner, who also directed the video for "Goodbye Says It All".

Chart performance
The song entered the Billboard Hot Country Songs chart on the week of September 2, 1994, and peaked at number 9 on the week of November 12, 1994.

Year-end charts

References

1994 songs
Blackhawk (band) songs
1994 singles
Songs written by Walt Aldridge
Songs written by John Jarrard
Arista Nashville singles
Song recordings produced by Mark Bright (record producer)